Munawwar Rana (born 26 November 1952) is an Indian Urdu poet.

Early life
Munawwar Rana was born in Rae Bareli in Uttar Pradesh, India in 1952, but spent most of his life in Kolkata, West Bengal.

Poetic style
He uses Hindi and Awadhi words and avoids Persian and Arabic. This makes his poetry accessible to Indian audiences and explains his popularity in the poetic meets held in non-Urdu areas.

Ghazals
Munawwar has published several ghazals. He has a distinct style of writing. Most of his shers (couplets) have Mother as the centre point of his love. His Urdu ghazals have been translated into English by Tapan Kumar Pradhan. :-

Awards
 Sahitya Akademi Award for Urdu Literature (2014). He returned the award about one year later. He vowed to never again accept a government award due to rising intolerance in the country leading to state sponsored communalism. 
 In 2012 he was awarded Maati Ratan Samman by Shaheed Shodha Sansthan for his services to Urdu literature.

Personal life
Munnawar Rana is married and lives in Lucknow.

His son was arrested by Rae Bareli police in August 2021 for allegedly having staged a shootout against himself in June in order to frame his uncle and cousin. This was purportedly done in relation to a property dispute. Munawwar Rana’s son Tabrez Rana was arrested from his house in Lal Kuan in Uttar Pradesh’s capital city Lucknow. He reportedly tried to flee when the police approached him. The court had issued a non-bailable warrant against him. He was brought to Rae Bareli with a large police convoy. Police also said Munawwar’s son Tabrez Rana wanted to contest the Assembly elections from Tiloi and had planned the attack on himself to get security and media coverage.

His daughter Sumaiya Rana, joined Samajwadi Party in the presence of party president Akhilesh Yadav.

Controversies

Ram Mandir Verdict 
In August 2020, Munawwar Rana accused former Chief Justice of India, Ranjan Gogoi of allegedly 'selling himself' to deliver the Ayodhya verdict. He further said that it was not justice, it was an order. His comment couldn't be even published due to its highly derogatory nature.

Murder of Samuel Paty 
In October 2020, he supported the murder in France after a school teacher used two caricatures of Prophet Muhammad from the pages of Charlie Hebdo in a class on 'Freedom of Expression'. Speaking to the media, Munawwar said that the caricatures are made to defame Prophet Muhammad and Islam. Such acts force people to take extreme steps as in the case of France. He further said that he too would have done the same had he been in his place. When asked during the interview, if he endorsed the killings, Mr. Rana repeated, “I will kill [that person].”

The Uttar Pradesh Police charged him under IPC 153A (Promoting enmity between different groups on the ground of religion), 295A (Deliberate and malicious acts, intended to outrage religious feelings of any class by insulting its religion), 298 (Uttering, words, etc, with deliberate intent to wound the religious feelings of any person), 505(1)(b) (Punishes those who intent to cause or likely to cause fear or alarm among the public, or any section of the public whereby any person may be induced to commit an offence against the state or against the public tranquility), 505(2) (Whoever makes, publishes or circulates any statement, rumour or report, with intent to incite, or which is likely to incite, any class or community of persons to commit any offence against any other class or community) and IT Act 67 and 66.

Talking to a news agency on Monday, Mr. Rana said he stood by his statement. “I stand by my statement. Na dal badlu hoon, na byan badlu hoon [Neither do I change sides, nor do I change my statements],” he said.

Favour of Taliban 
Munawwar Rana also refused to recognize the Taliban as a terrorist organization but they are fighting for their country, amid an ongoing controversy over the statements made in favor of the Taliban.

Comparing Maharishi Valmiki To Taliban 
In August 2020 while talking to a channel, he had said, Valmiki “became a God after he wrote the Ramayana, before that he was a dacoit. A person’s character can change. Similarly, the Taliban, for now, are terrorists but people and characters change. When you talk about Valmiki, you will have to talk about his past. In your religion, you make anyone God. But he was a writer, and he wrote the Ramayana, but we are not in competition here.”

In response, Madhya Pradesh Police registered the case under IPC Section 505(2) (statements conducing to public mischief) and was forwarded to Hazratganj police station at Lucknow in UP. Another FIR registered against him mention IPC Sections 505 (2) (public mischief) and the Scheduled Caste and Scheduled Tribe (Prevention of Atrocities) Act.

The Allahabad High Court refused to quash an FIR filed against him for allegedly comparing Ramayana author Valmiki, with the Taliban. The division bench of Justice Ramesh Sinha and Justice Saroj Yadav even asked Rana’s lawyer, “Why do you (Rana) make such kind of remarks. Why don’t you (Rana) do what your work is?”

See also
 List of Sahitya Akademi Award winners for Urdu
 Ranjan Gogoi
 Tapan Kumar Pradhan
 Murder of Samuel Paty

References

External links
 Munawwar Rana's selected couplets
 Official site
 Books by Munawwar Rana

Indian male poets
Urdu-language poets from India
Living people
1952 births
Poets from Uttar Pradesh
People from Raebareli
People from Bareilly district
20th-century Indian poets
20th-century Indian male writers
Urdu-language literature
Recipients of the Sahitya Akademi Award in Urdu
Jibanananda Das Award